Bajwa is a Jat surname and tribe name commonly found among the Sikhs, Hindus and Muslims of the Punjab region in India and Pakistan. 

Notable people bearing the Bajwa name, who may or may not be affiliated with the clan, include:
Arjan Bajwa (born 1979), Indian actor and model
Asif Bajwa (born 1969), Pakistani field hockey player
Asim Saleem Bajwa, Pakistani former military officer
Charanjit Kaur Bajwa (born 1959), Indian politician
Javed Ashraf Bajwa, Pakistani military officer
Jugpreet Singh Bajwa (born 1994), Indo-Canadian singer
Neeru Bajwa (born 1982), Indo-Canadian actress
Poonam Bajwa, Indian actress
Pratap Singh Bajwa (born 1957), Indian politician
Qamar Javed Bajwa (born 1960), Pakistani military officer
Rupa Bajwa (born 1976), Indian writer
Sonam Bajwa (born 1989), Indian model and actress
Surinder Singh Bajwa (–2007), Indian politician
Tariq Bajwa, Pakistani civil servant
Tariq Mahmood Bajwa, Pakistani politician
Tripat Rajinder Singh Bajwa, Indian politician
T. S. Bajwa, Indian politician
Varinder Singh Bajwa, Indian politician

References

Punjabi tribes
Jat clans of Punjab
Punjabi-language surnames